The Kuy are an indigenous ethnic group of mainland Southeast Asia. The native lands of the Kuy range from the southern Khorat Plateau in northeast Thailand east to the banks of the Mekong River in southern Laos and south to north central Cambodia. The Kuy are an ethnic minority in all three countries, where they live as "hill tribes" or Montagnards. Their language is classified as a Katuic language of the Mon-Khmer language family and, as such, is related to the Khmer language of Cambodia. The Thais, Lao, and Khmer traditionally recognize the Kuy as the aboriginal inhabitants of the region and refer to them as Khmer boran (Khmer), meaning "ancient Khmer" or Khamen pa dong ("jungle Khmer people"). The word kuy in the Kuy language means "people" or "human being"; alternate English spellings include Kui, Kuoy and Kuay, while forms similar to "Suay" or "Suei" are derived from the Thai/Lao exonyms meaning "those who pay tribute". The Kuy are known as skilled mahouts, or elephant trainers, and many Kuy villages are employed in finding, taming, and selling elephants.

Geographic distribution
The Kuy are found in a region of mainland Southeast Asia roughly between the Dangrek Mountains and the Mun River, straddling the borders where Thailand, Cambodia, and Laos meet. The majority, over 80 percent, live in Thailand in the provinces of Surin, Buriram, Sisaket, Nakhon Ratchasima, and Ubon Ratchathani. From Ubon Ratchathani, their range continues over the Lao border where another 43,000 live in Savannakhet, Salavan and Champasak provinces along both banks of the Mekong. Across the Cambodian border, approximately 38,000 Kuy live mainly in Preah Vihear, Steung Treng, Siem Reap, and northern Kampong Thom with a small population in Kratie.
In Cambodia and Laos, Kuy is considered a "hill tribe" and, especially in Laos, many live in remote isolated areas in separate villages and have not integrated into mainstream society. In Cambodia, where significant numbers of Kuy also live among the Khmer, they are considered a Khmer Loeu group while in Laos there are counted among the Lao Theung ("midland Lao"). In Thailand, most Kuy people are more socially integrated and often live in mixed villages alongside the immigrants Northern Khmer.

Culture 
Traditional Kuy culture is similar to other Mon-Khmer minority groups of Southeast Asia. Historically, they were subsistence farmers and supplemented this by weaving, raising livestock, and fishing. During times of drought or when the soil lost its fertility, whole villages relocated to more favorable land. Veneration of spirits, known by the Lao term satsana phi, was the primary religious or cosmological belief. In addition to ancestor spirits, Kuy believe in other nature spirits including that of the monitor lizard (takuat) which they believe to be symbol of fertility. The Kuy perform ceremonies to propitiate the takuat spirit and ask for fertility from nature. They would also take the tail of the lizard to use in divination ceremonies. Those of ill health would perform a ceremony called kael mo for healing. Those Kuy who raise and train elephants venerate their own set of spirits related to their work, so-called "Pakam" which is located mostly in Thailand.

Modern Kuy, however, is influenced by the dominant culture of the country in which they live. Most Kuy in Thailand, for example, where 20th century Thaification policies outlawed spirit worship, have adopted the local form of Theravada Buddhism and some, start using Isan Thai as an alternate first language. Seventy-four percent of the Kuy in Cambodia are no longer fluent in Kuy, having adopted Khmer for daily use, and many have all but integrated into Khmer society although a significant portion still participates in traditional Kuy spiritual activities alongside Khmer Buddhism.

Women have an esteemed position in Kui society ensuring community cohesion and spiritual beliefs, apart from their central role in subsistence food production.

Language
As with other aspects of Kuy culture, language use varies based on the country of residence. The Kuy in Thailand have been subject to Thaification policies in the past and, while maintaining positive views about their native language (Kuy), most often use the local Lao dialect. Thai Kuy are also fluent in Central Thai and 40 percent also use Northern Khmer. In Laos, which has the largest population of Kuy monolinguals, approximately 80 percent speak only Kuy. The remaining Kuy of Laos also uses Lao. Only 26 percent of the Kuy in Cambodia reported being able to communicate in the Kuy language with the remainder speaking only Khmer. The Kuy language had been reported to have no alphabet of its own until recently the Kui Association of Thailand has launched 21st Kui/Kuy writing system developed by Dr. Sanong Suksaweang for all the Kui/Kuy. However, most of the Kuy have not learned and have been using the national language Thai script in Thailand, Khmer script in Cambodia, and Lao script in Laos.

The Kuy language belongs to the Austroasiatic language family, within which several more closely related languages, including Bru, Ta-Oi, and Kuy, among others, make up the Katuic subgroup. Kuy accounts for the largest group of Katuic speakers with recent estimates placing their numbers at 800,000, double the more conservative traditionally accepted estimates. Separated by distance, geographical features and political borders, Kuy speakers' speech has evolved into several marked, but mutually intelligible, dialects. In Thailand, two major dialects have been recognized, each of which can be further divided into sub-dialects. Cambodian Kuy has been described as having four distinct dialects, while the political situation in Laos has made study of Kuy dialects there difficult.

Subgroups
Research of the late-19th to early-20th century reported that the Kuy of the time were "vaguely aware" of different clans or tribes within Kuy society, but even by that time consciousness of these divisions was waning. A 1988 study found that modern Kuy were no longer conscious of any clan or tribal affiliation and, among themselves, only recognized differences in dialect and national origin. One exception were the approximately 200 Kuy Nheu (ɲə), found in the Sisaket, Phrai Bueng and Rasi Salai districts of Srisaket, who were "very conscious of the fact that they were different from all other Kui".

Kuy in Cambodia

The Kuy people are actively engaged in efforts to preserve Prey Lang forest in Cambodia. Prey Lang's name originated from the Kuy language and means "the forest (Prey) which belongs to all of us".
Organisations including Amnesty International and Cultural Survival have documented how Kuy people have faced development aggression and been forcefully evicted from their homes due to economic land concessions.

The "spirit forest" is an integral part of Kuy culture, however spirit forests are increasingly impacted by mining interests as Cambodia develops.
Some Kuy people are artisans with unique basket and textile weaving skills. Some Kuy are rice farmers or raise silk worms and weave silk.

The Cambodian Indigenous Youth Association has members who are Kuy people who study and work in Phnom Penh.

Famous Kuy people 
 Buakaw Banchamek — Thai Kuy descent welterweight Muay Thai kickboxer
 Tony Jaa — Thai Kuy descent martial artist, actor, action choreographer, stuntman and director

References

External links
I’ll meet you near the temple

Indigenous peoples of Southeast Asia
Ethnic groups in Thailand
Ethnic groups in Cambodia
Ethnic groups in Laos